State Road 608 (NM 608) was a  state highway in the US state of New Mexico. NM 608's southern terminus was at NM 609 in Gallup, and the northern terminus was at U.S. Route 491 (US 491) north of Gallup. NM 608 was given to the city of Gallup in 2017. The road is now known as Ninth Street.

Major intersections

See also

References

608
Transportation in McKinley County, New Mexico
Gallup, New Mexico